Vadim Kaptur (born 12 July 1987, Minsk) is a Belarusian diver who competed at the 2008, 2012 and 2016 Summer Olympics.

He began diving in 1994 in Minsk.  He competes for Dinamo Minsk, and his national coach is Viachaslau Khamulkin.  He made his international debut in 1998.

References

External links

1987 births
Living people
Belarusian male divers
Olympic divers of Belarus
Divers at the 2008 Summer Olympics
Divers at the 2012 Summer Olympics
Divers at the 2016 Summer Olympics
Sportspeople from Minsk